Aleksey Ivanovich Kandinsky (24 February 1918 – 4 October 2000) was a Soviet musicologist who is known for his writings on contemporary Russian musical life and Russian music of the 19th and early 20th centuries. In addition to writing a biography on Nikolai Rimsky-Korsakov, he penned seminal writings on the works of Mily Balakirev, Alexander Dargomyzhsky, and Sergei Rachmaninoff. In 1969 he was named a Meritorious Artist of the Russian Federation.

Career
Born in Moscow, Kandinsky was the grandson of artist Wassily Kandinsky. From 1935 to 1939 he studied at the Ippolitov-Ivanov College of Music in Moscow where he was a pupil of Vasily Nikolayevich Argamakov. After serving in the Russian Army during World War II, he pursued graduate music studies under Yury Keldïsh  at the Moscow Conservatory where he earned a master's degree in 1948 and a Doctorate in 1956. His doctoral dissertation was on the operas of Rimsky-Korsakov.

After earning his master's degree, Kandinsky became a lecturer at the Moscow Conservatory in 1948. He became a full professor there in 1958 and served as the head of the music history department at the Moscow Conservatory from 1959 until 1992.

Sources

1918 births
2000 deaths
Moscow Conservatory alumni
Academic staff of Moscow Conservatory
Soviet musicologists
20th-century musicologists